Oginohana may refer to:

Oginohana Masaaki (1935-2006), sumo wrestler
Oginohana Akikazu (b.1967), also a sumo wrestler, son of the former